Puirt à beul (literally "tunes from a mouth") is a traditional form of song native to Scotland (known as portaireacht in Ireland) that sets Gaelic lyrics to instrumental tune melodies. Historically, they were used to accompany dancing in the absence of instruments and to transmit instrumental tunes orally.

Term
The Scottish Gaelic term port à beul refers to "a tune from a mouth—specifically a cheerful tune—which in the plural becomes puirt à beul". In Scotland, they are usually referred to as puirt à beul but a variety of other spellings and misspellings also exists, for example port-a-beul, puirt a bheul, puirt a' bhéil, etc. These are mostly because a number of grammatical particles in Gaelic are very similar in nature, such as the definite article a, the prepositions "of" and "to" which can both be a and the preposition á "from" which can appear without the acute accent.

Modern Irish dictionaries give port (aireacht) béil, translated as "mouth music" also referred to as lilting. Older dictionaries, such as Dinneen, only give portaiḋeaċt, portaireaċt, or portonaċt. Puirt à beul are related to Irish lilting, Scottish diddling, New Brunswick chin music, and other "Celtic" forms of mouth music. However, whereas these latter forms of mouth music consist of improvised vocables, puirt à beul lyrics are fixed and almost always consist of "real" (i.e., lexical) words, although sometimes vocables are also present.

Origin
Puirt à beul has sometimes been used for dancing when no instruments were available. Although some people believe that puirt à beul derives from a time when musical instruments, particularly bagpipes, were unavailable because they were banned, there is no evidence that musical instruments were banned by the Disarming Acts or the Act of Proscription 1746. In his book Traditional Gaelic Bagpiping 1745-1945, John Gibson reprints the entire Disarming Act of 1746, which is usually blamed for the proscription of bagpipes, and shows that bagpipes were not banned.

Characteristics
Usually, the genre involves a single performer singing lighthearted, sometimes bawdy lyrics, occasionally supplemented with meaningless vocables.

In puirt à beul, the rhythm and sound of the song often have more importance than the rhythm of the lyrics. Although puirt à beul are traditionally performed by a solo singer, there are many choral arrangements or puirt à beul today, and group performances are sometimes presented at mods.

Some elements of puirt à beul may have originated as memory aids or as alternatives to instrumental forms such as bagpipe music.

A well-known example of puirt à beul is "Brochan Lom", which is sung in the film Whisky Galore!, and occurs as background music in the film The Bridal Path.  A third example, sung by Kitty MacLeod and her sister, occurs in Walt Disney’s 
Rob Roy, the Highland Rogue, during the wedding celebration.

Quadriga Consort has been the first ensemble to bring puirt à beul into early music revival.

Mouth music in the Americas
Mouth music was probably once common in areas of North America where Gaelic-speaking Scottish Highlanders predominated, in particular the Cape Fear area of North Carolina and Cape Breton Island in Nova Scotia. Nowadays it is largely restricted to the latter, as it was a more homogeneous society with less access to other cultural areas.

See also
 Crimping
 Mouth Music (band)
 Non-lexical vocables in music
 Scat singing
 Waulking song

References

External links
 Information on Education Scotland website
 
 Mouth music: The Hazel by the River on archive.org
 Spotify Playlist, lilting songs from Ireland

Vocal music
Scottish Gaelic music